The Clapham Sect, or Clapham Saints, were a group of social reformers associated with Clapham in the period from the 1780s to the 1840s. Despite the label "sect", most members remained in the established (and dominant) Church of England, which was highly interwoven with offices of state. However, its successors were in many cases outside of the established Anglican Church.

History 

The Clapham movement grew from 18th-century evangelical trends in the Church of England (the Anglican Church) and started to coalesce around residents of Clapham, especially during the rectorship there of  John Venn (in office: 1792-1813)
and came to engage in systematically advocating social reform.

In the course of time the growth of evangelical Christian revivalism in England
and the movement for Catholic emancipation fed into a waning of the old precept that every Englishman automatically counted as an Anglican.
Some new Christian groups (such as the  Methodists and the Plymouth Brethren) moved away from Anglicanism, and the Christian social reformers who succeeded the Claphamites from about the 1830s
often exemplified Nonconformist conscience
and identified with groups functioning outside the established Anglican Church.

Summary and context
These were reformists and abolitionists, being contemporary terms as the 'Sect' was – until 1844 – unnamed. They figured and heard readings, sermons and lessons from prominent and wealthy Evangelical Anglicans who called for the liberation of slaves, abolition of the slave trade and the reform of the penal system, and recognised and advocated other cornerstone civil-political rights and socio-economic rights. Defying the status quo of labour exploitation and consequent vested interests in the legislature was laborious and was motivated by their Christian faith and concern for social justice and fairness for all human beings. Their most famous member was William Wilberforce, widely commemorated in monuments and credited with hastening the end of the slave trade.

Electoral and other political rights were a main cause of all Radicals then their Northern successors the Chartists, their shared earliest success being the Great Reform Act 1832. Many of the other key rights saw a comparative context in treatises of the Age of Enlightenment, and Age of Revolutions. France's 1789 Declaration of the Rights of Man and of the Citizen, together with the 1689 English Bill of Rights, the 1776 United States Declaration of Independence, and the 1789 United States Bill of Rights, inspired, in large part, the 1948 United Nations Universal Declaration of Human Rights.

Campaigns and successes
 
The name stems from most of its figures being non-dissenting parishioners of Clapham, then a village south of London (today part of south-west London), where Wilberforce and Thornton, its two most influential leaders, often lived and met. Liturgy, sermons and sometimes meetings at Holy Trinity Church on Clapham Common were a central feature, largely neighboured by upmarket new homes and expensive single-home plots of land (fashionable villas in the terms of the time).

Henry Venn, since seen as the founder, was lesser clergy, Curate, there (from at least 1754) and his son John became rector (parish priest) (1792–1813). The House of Commons politicians (MPs) William Wilberforce (first elected 1780) and Henry Thornton (first elected 1782), two of the most influential of the sect were parishioners and many of the meetings were held in their houses. They were encouraged by Beilby Porteus, the Bishop of London, himself an abolitionist and reformer, who sympathised with many of their aims.  The term "Clapham Sect" is an almost non-contemporaneous invention by James Stephen in an article of 1844 which celebrated and romanticised the work of these reformers.

The reformers were partly composed of members from St Edmund Hall, Oxford and Magdalene College, Cambridge, where the Vicar of Holy Trinity Church, Charles Simeon had preached to students from the university, some of whom underwent an evangelical conversion experience and later became associated with the Clapham Sect.

Lampooned in their day as "the saints", the group published a journal, the Christian Observer, edited by Zachary Macaulay and were also credited with the foundation of several missionary and tract societies, including the British and Foreign Bible Society and the Church Missionary Society.

After many decades of work both in British society and in Parliament, the reformers saw their efforts rewarded with the final passage of the Slave Trade Act 1807, banning the trade throughout the British Empire and, after many further years of campaigning, the total emancipation of British slaves with the passing of the Slavery Abolition Act 1833. They also campaigned vigorously for Britain to use its influence to work towards abolishing slavery throughout the world.

Some of the group, Granville Sharp, Thomas Clarkson and William Wilberforce, were responsible for the founding in 1787 of Sierra Leone as a settlement for some of the African-Americans freed by the British during the American Revolutionary War; it thus became the first non trading-post British "colony" akin to a fledgling mission state in Africa, whose purpose in Clarkson's words was "the abolition of the slave trade, the civilisation of Africa, and the introduction of the gospel there". Later, in 1792, another of the group John Clarkson was instrumental in the creation of its capital Freetown.

The group are described by the historian Stephen Tomkins as "a network of friends and families in England, with William Wilberforce as its centre of gravity, who were powerfully bound together by their shared moral and spiritual values, by their religious mission and social activism, by their love for each other, and by marriage".

By 1848 when evangelical bishop John Bird Sumner became Archbishop of Canterbury, it is said that between a quarter and a third of Anglican clergy were linked to the movement, which by then had diversified greatly in its goals, although they were no longer considered an organised faction.

Members of the group founded or were involved with a number of other societies, including  the Abolition Society, formally known as the Society for Effecting the Abolition of the Slave Trade (founded by Clarkson, Sharp and others) and run largely by white middle-class women of Quaker, Unitarian and Evangelical faiths
The  Society for the Mitigation and Gradual Abolition of Slavery Throughout the British Dominions followed, in 1823, and there was also the Proclamation Society, the Sunday School Society, the Bettering Society, and the Small Debt Society.

The Clapham Sect have been credited with playing a significant part in the development of Victorian morality, through their writings, their societies, their influence in Parliament, and their example in philanthropy and moral campaigns, especially against slavery. In the words of Tomkins, "The ethos of Clapham became the spirit of the age."

Members
Members of the Clapham Sect, and those associated with them, included:

 Thomas Fowell Buxton (1786–1845), leader of the movement for the abolition of slavery, MP for Weymouth and Melcombe Regis and brewer
 William Dealtry (1775–1847), Rector of Holy Trinity Church, Clapham, mathematician
 Edward James Eliot (1758–97), MP for St Germans and Liskeard
 Samuel Gardiner (1755-1827) and his wife Mary Boddam  of Coombe Lodge, Whitchurch-on-Thames
 Thomas Gisborne (1758–1846), Prebendary of Durham Cathedral and author
 Charles Grant (1746–1823), administrator, chairman of the directors of the British East India Company, father of the first Lord Glenelg
 Zachary Macaulay (1768–1838), estate manager, governor of Sierra Leone, father of Thomas Babington Macaulay
 Hannah More (1745–1833), bluestocking, playwright, religious writer and philanthropist
 Granville Sharp (1735–1813), campaigner for social justice, scholar and administrator
 Charles Simeon (1759–1836), Anglican cleric, minister of Holy Trinity Church, Cambridge, promoter of missions
 James Stephen (1758–1832), Master of Chancery, great-grandfather of Virginia Woolf
 Lord Teignmouth (1751–1834), Governor-general of India
 Henry Thornton (1760–1815), economist, banker, philanthropist, Member of Parliament (MP) for Southwark, great-grandfather of writer E.M. Forster
 Marianne Thornton (1797-1887), daughter of Henry Thornton
 Henry Venn (1725–97), curate of Holy Trinity Church, Clapham, and founder of the group, father of John Venn (priest) and great-grandfather of John Venn (originator of the Venn diagram)
 John Venn (1759–1813), Rector of Holy Trinity Church, Clapham
 William Wilberforce (1759–1833), MP for Kingston upon Hull, Yorkshire and Bramber, abolitionist, and leader of the campaign against the slave trade
 William Smith (1756–1835), MP for Sudbury and Norwich

See also

 List of abolitionist forerunners

References

Further reading
 Brown, Ford K. Fathers of the Victorians: The Age of Wilberforce (1961).
 Burton, Ann M. "British Evangelicals, Economic Warfare and the Abolition of the Atlantic Slave Trade, 1794–1810." Anglican and Episcopal History 65#2 (1996): 197–225. in JSTOR
Butler, Ryan J. “Transatlantic Discontinuity? The Clapham Sect’s Influence in the United States.” Church history 88, no. 3 (2019): 672–695.
 Cowper, William. "'The Better Hour Is Near': Wilberforce And Transformative Religion." (Evangelical History Association Lecture 2013) online
 Danker, Ryan Nicholas. Wesley and the Anglicans: Political Division in Early Evangelicalism (InterVarsity Press, 2016).
 Hennell, Michael. John Venn and the Clapham Sect (1958).
 Hilton, Boyd. The Age of Atonement: The Influence of Evangelicalism on Social and Economic Thought, 1795-‐1865 (1988).
 Hilton, Boyd. A Mad, Bad, Dangerous People? England 1783–1846 (2006), pp 174–88, passim.
 Himmelfarb, Gertrude. "From Clapham to Bloomsbury: A Genealogy of Morals." Commentary 79.2 (1985): 36.
 Howse, Ernest Marshall. Saints in Politics: The 'Clapham Sect' and the Growth of Freedom (University of Toronto Press, 1952)
 Klein, Milton M. Amazing Grace: John Thornton & the Clapham Sect (2004),  160 pp.
 
 Spring, David. "The Clapham Sect: Some Social and Political Aspects." Victorian Studies 5#1 (1961): 35–48. in JSTOR
 Tomkins, Stephen. The Clapham Sect: How Wilberforce’s Circle Changed Britain (Oxford: Lion Hudson,  2010)
 Tomkins, Stephen. William Wilberforce: A Biography (Wm. B. Eerdmans Publishing, 2007).
 Ward, William Reginald. The Protestant Evangelical Awakening (Cambridge University Press, 2002).
 Wolffe, John/ "Clapham Sect (act. 1792–1815)", Oxford Dictionary of National Biography 2005; online edn, Oct 2016 accessed 13 Nov 2017

External links 
 The Clapham Group – 1701–1800 – Church History Timeline
 William Wilberforce (1759–1833): The Shrimp Who Stopped Slavery by Christopher D. Hancock
 William Wilberforce 'condoned slavery', Colonial Office papers reveal – The Guardian – Davies, Caroline. Monday 2 August 2010.
 Do-gooders in 1790s London – The Economist – Aug 26th 2010

 
History of the Church of England
Church of England societies and organisations
19th-century disestablishments in England
English theologians
Abolitionist organizations
Evangelical Anglicanism
Anglican organizations established in the 18th century
19th-century Protestantism
18th-century Protestantism
Clapham
History of the London Borough of Lambeth